George Town Council is a local government body in northern Tasmania, situated north of Launceston. The George Town local government area is classified as rural and has a population of 6,931, it encompasses the principal town, George Town, and the nearby localities including Hillwood, Low Head and Pipers River.

History and attributes
The George Town municipality was established on 1 January 1907. George Town is classified as rural, agricultural and large (RAL) under the Australian Classification of Local Governments.

Suburbs

See also
List of local government areas of Tasmania

References

External links
George Town Council official website
Local Government Association Tasmania
Tasmanian Electoral Commission - local government

 
Local government areas of Tasmania